Octavio Suárez (born 26 July 1944) is a Cuban gymnast. He competed at the 1964 Summer Olympics and the 1968 Summer Olympics.

References

1944 births
Living people
Cuban male artistic gymnasts
Olympic gymnasts of Cuba
Gymnasts at the 1964 Summer Olympics
Gymnasts at the 1968 Summer Olympics
Sportspeople from Havana
Pan American Games medalists in gymnastics
Pan American Games silver medalists for Cuba
Pan American Games bronze medalists for Cuba
Gymnasts at the 1963 Pan American Games
Gymnasts at the 1967 Pan American Games
Medalists at the 1967 Pan American Games
21st-century Cuban people
20th-century Cuban people